Do Ab-e Mikh-e Zarrin is a village in Baghlan Province in north eastern Afghanistan.

Do Ab-e-Mikh-e-Zarin is the commercial town in Kahmard district of Bamiyan province. Previously this was part of Baghlan province.

See also 
Baghlan Province

References

External links 
Satellite map at Maplandia.com 

Populated places in Baghlan Province